The 1999 WNBA All-Star Game was played on July 14, 1999, at Madison Square Garden in New York City. Even though the WNBA began in 1997, this was the inaugural All-Star Game.

The All-Star Game

Rosters

1 Injured
2 Injury Replacement

Coaches
The coach for the Western Conference was Houston Comets coach Van Chancellor. The coach for the Eastern Conference was Cleveland Rockers coach Linda Hill-MacDonald.

References

Wnba All-star Game, 1999
Women's National Basketball Association All-Star Game